The 1939–40 Duquesne Dukes men's ice hockey season was the 3rd season of play for the program.

Season
Before the season even began, Duquesne got unwelcome news when their biggest rival and the only team to defeat them all of last year, Pittsburgh, terminated their hockey program. While their withdrawal would make it easier for the Dukes as far as winning games, the still-young program had bigger concerns. The Loss of Pitt meant that the team would have to travel to Cleveland more often, increasing the cost of running the team, and it would likely damper interest in the sport from locals. On top of those problems, what did it say about the league when one of the best teams for the first two seasons (Pitt had made the conference final both years) just quit before the season was to begin? In spite of the troubles, the remaining 6 teams and the rink operators decided to continue with the league and set down the schedule in early December.

The Dukes got off to a good start, winning their first five games and sitting atop league standings with John Carroll. The program went on its first non-conference road trip in mid-January, playing three non-conference team in a swing through upstate New York. While it wasn't a surprise to lose to Clarkson, getting embarrassed by the tune of 10–0 was not what the Dukes were hoping for. To make matters worse, they team lost the other two games by sizable margins and made it look like the team had been living in a too-comfortable bubble with the Penn-Ohio League. Despite the losses, Duquesne did achieve its main goal by introducing itself to other programs and hoped that they would be able to schedule further games in the future.

Duquesne sat out the rest of the semester for examinations and came back at the beginning of February. The team met John Carroll for a home-and-home series with league bragging right on the line. The powerhouse Blue Streaks took both games to make it nearly impossible for Duquesne to repeat as regular season champions, but the Dukes could still make the playoffs as long as they took care of business. The Dukes recovered from their losing streak with three consecutive wins and guaranteed themselves a second-place finish despite having two games remaining.

In the playoff series against John Carroll, Duquesne played the undefeated Blue Streaks about as well as could be expected. They lost a close affair in the first game and then pushed JCU into overtime in the rematch. Unfortunately, Duquesne wasn't able to tie the series and fell 5–6.

The loss was the last for the program as both Duquesne and Carnegie Tech suspended their ice hockey teams after the year. The Penn-Ohio League would continue for one more season with 4 schools before dissolving in 1941.

Doug Wells served as team manager

Roster

Standings

Schedule and Results

|-
!colspan=12 style=";" | Regular Season

|-
!colspan=12 style=";" | Penn-Ohio League Playoffs

|- align="center" bgcolor="#e0e0e0"
|colspan=12|Duquesne Lost Series 0–2

References

Duquesne Dukes men's ice hockey seasons
Duquesne
Duquesne
Duquesne
Duquesne